Sujud  is a prostration to Allah in Salah.

Sujud may also refer to:
 Sujud Sahwi is a gesture during the Salah prayer.
 Sujud Shukr is a gesture to thank Allah.
 Sujud Tilawa is a gesture during the Quran recitation.
 Sujud celebration is the practice of celebrating the scoring of a goal.
 Sujud Sutrisno is an Indonesian street musician.

See also
 Prostration (disambiguation)
 Sajda (disambiguation)
 Sajid (disambiguation)